Bucculatrix litigiosella is a moth in the family Bucculatricidae. It was described by Philipp Christoph Zeller in 1875. It is found in North America, where it has been recorded from Texas.

References

Natural History Museum Lepidoptera generic names catalog

Bucculatricidae
Moths described in 1875
Taxa named by Philipp Christoph Zeller
Moths of North America